Massachusetts held a special election to fill a vacancy in Massachusetts's 5th congressional district on October 16, 2007. Democrat Niki Tsongas won election to Congress, defeating Republican Jim Ogonowski in an election that was closer than expected.

Marty Meehan had been the district's Representative to Congress since 1993. He announced his resignation in May 2007 (effective July 1), allowing him to become the next Chancellor of the University of Massachusetts Lowell. Meehan had last won re-election in 2006, when he ran unopposed. The district was considered to be strongly Democratic, as it voted 58% for the Democratic candidate (John Kerry) in the most recent presidential election. In addition, Massachusetts had not elected a Republican to Congress since Peter Blute and Peter Torkildsen were last elected to office in 1994 (both were defeated in 1996). No Republican had held the 5th congressional district's seat since Paul W. Cronin departed from office in 1975 after his defeat by Democrat Paul Tsongas in 1974.

A primary election was held on September 4, 2007 to determine each political party's nominee for the general election. Niki Tsongas won the Democratic nomination and Jim Ogonowski won the Republican nomination. Tsongas won the general election, held on October 16, 2007, with 51% of the vote; Ogonowski received 45%.

Candidates
All candidates for the election are listed alphabetically first by party, then by name. Bold is primary winners and general election candidates.

Constitution
Kevin Thompson – State Constitution Party Secretary from Brockton

Democratic
Eileen Donoghue – City Councilor and former Lowell Mayor
Jamie Eldridge – State Representative from Acton
Barry Finegold – State Representative from Andover
Jim Miceli – State Representative from Wilmington
Niki Tsongas – Dean at Middlesex Community College from Lowell, and widow of Paul Tsongas

Independent
Kurt Hayes – Businessman from Boxborough
Patrick O. Murphy – Brick and stonemason from Lowell

Republican
Jim Ogonowski – Former Air Force Lt. Colonel from Dracut, and brother of John
Thomas Tierney – Self-Employed Independent Consulting Actuary from Framingham

Withdrawn / not running

Democratic   
James DiPaola – Middlesex County Sheriff   
David O'Brien – Democratic National Committee member from Concord

Republican   
Fred Smerlas – Former NFL defensive lineman
Michael J. Sullivan – Mayor of Lawrence

Polling

Democratic Primary

Republican Primary

General Election

Results

Bold indicates winner of nomination. Source: https://web.archive.org/web/20120207164837/http://www.thebostonchannel.com/politics/14003157/detail.html

General Election

Democratic Primary

Republican Primary

See also 
 List of special elections to the United States House of Representatives

References

External links

Candidate Web Sites

Democratic 
 Eileen Donoghue for Congress web site
 Jamie Eldridge for Congress web site
 Barry Finegold for Congress web site
 Jim Miceli for Congress web site
 Niki Tsongas for Congress web site

Republican 
 Jim Ogonowski for Congress web site
 Tom Tierney for Congress web site

Constitution 
 Kevin Thompson for Congress web site

Independent 
 Kurt Hayes for Congress web site
 Patrick Murphy for Congress web site

Massachusetts 05
2007 05
Massachusetts 2007 05
United States House of Representatives 05
United States House of Representatives 2007 05
Massachusetts 2007 05